John Richard Christopher King (born June 25, 1976) is an American politician. He is a member of the South Carolina House of Representatives from the 49th District, serving since 2009. He is a member of the Democratic party. King previously served as a Chester city councilman from 1999 to 2000 and county councilman from 2000 to 2006. King is also a funeral director at Christopher King's Funeral Home in Chester, South Carolina, Professor at Clinton College in Rock Hill, SC.

King serves as 2nd Vice Chair of the House Judiciary Committee and is a member of the House Ethics Committee. He serves as an At-Large member of the National Black Caucus of State Legislatures.

References

External links 

Living people
1976 births
African-American state legislators in South Carolina
Democratic Party members of the South Carolina House of Representatives
21st-century American politicians
21st-century African-American politicians
20th-century African-American people